Tomas Leandersson (11 April 1966 – 2 November 2021) was a Swedish ten-pin bowler.

Biography 
Leandersson was from Degerfors, Sweden.

Leandersson was a member of Team Sweden for over ten years, and was a member of the team that won the gold medal in the 1990 Nordic Bowling Championships. His team also won the 1994 World Tenpin Team Cup and the 1999 International Bowling Federation WTBA World Tenpin Bowling Championships.

Individual records and awards include the following:

 Winner of men's singles at the 1993 World Games and the 1999 European Championships
 Bronze medal, 1991 FIQ/WTBA World Championships Masters and 1999 All Events
 World Bowling Writers World Bowler of the Year in 1993
 Won the Bowling World Cup in 2000
 Elected to the World Bowling Writers  International Bowling Hall of Fame in 2000

References

External links
Super Series Profile

1966 births
2021 deaths
Swedish ten-pin bowling players
People from Degerfors Municipality
Sportspeople from Örebro County
World Games gold medalists
World Games medalists in bowling